Shadyside or Shady Side or variation, may refer to:

Places in the United States
(by state)
 Shady Side, Maryland, a settlement in Anne Arundel County
 Shadyside, Edgewater, a neighborhood of Edgewater, New Jersey
 Shadyside, Michigan, an unincorporated community
 Shadyside, Ohio, a village in Belmont County, Ohio
 Shadyside (Pittsburgh), a neighborhood of Pittsburgh, Pennsylvania
 Shadyside, Houston, a community in Houston, Texas

Other uses
 Shadyside (Natchez, Mississippi), a historic house listed on the National Register of Historic Places
 Shady Side Academy, a school in Pittsburgh, Pennsylvania
 Shady Side (steamboat), built 1873
 Bedford Shadyside, the original name of The Chickenburger in Bedford, Nova Scotia
 Shadyside, a fictional town in the Fear Street books by R. L. Stine

See also
 Sunnyside (disambiguation)
 Shady (disambiguation)
 Side (disambiguation)